Aaron James Gale (born 8 April 1970) is a former New Zealand cricketer. In 1992–93 he took a hat-trick for Otago against Canterbury.

Gale was born at Balclutha in Otago in 1970. He was educated at Otago Boys' High School in Dunedin and worked professionally as an accountant. He played under-19 Test and One Day International cricket for New Zealand.

Gale toured India as part of the Zealand Test squad in 1995.

In the early 2000s he played club cricket in England for Harefield Cricket Club.

In November 2022, Gale was inducted as a lifetime member of the Rolleston Rise golf and cricket club in Hokitika.

References

1970 births
Living people
New Zealand cricketers
Otago cricketers
Sportspeople from Balclutha, New Zealand